Baumann Valley is a valley at the west side of Nottage Ridge in the east part of the Olympus Range, Victoria Land. It was named by the Advisory Committee on Antarctic Names (1997) after Clinton L. Baumann, electronic technician, Applied Physics Laboratory, Johns Hopkins University, who was a member of the 1971–72 United States Geological Survey field party that established a network of horizontal and vertical control in support of compilation of topographic maps, at 1:50,000 scale, of areas of McMurdo Dry Valleys.

References
 

Valleys of Victoria Land
McMurdo Dry Valleys